"Black & White" is a song by American rapper and singer Juice Wrld. It was released on May 23, 2018, as the sixth track from his debut studio album Goodbye & Good Riddance.

Composition
"Black & White" continues the theme of Goodbye & Good Riddance with an ode to codeine, cocaine, and other addicting drugs.

Music video 
The music video was released on October 3, 2018. The video follows Juice Wrld as he parties nonstop with his friends in a luxurious mansion. Eventually, the rapper passes away in the video and visits his own memorial. The video was directed by R.J. Sanchez and has 164 million views as of September 24 2021.

Charts

Certifications

References

2018 songs
Benny Blanco songs
Juice Wrld songs
Songs written by Benny Blanco
Songs written by Cashmere Cat
Songs written by Juice Wrld
Songs written by Happy Perez
Songs written by Sasha Alex Sloan